The 1980 Rhode Island gubernatorial election was held on November 4, 1980. Incumbent Democrat J. Joseph Garrahy defeated Republican nominee Buddy Cianci with 73.71% of the vote.

General election

Candidates
J. Joseph Garrahy, Democratic
Buddy Cianci, Republican

Results

References

1980
Rhode Island
Gubernatorial